George Lionel Throssell  (23 May 1840 – 30 August 1910) was the second Premier of Western Australia.  He served for just three months, from 15 February to 27 May 1901, during a period of great instability in Western Australian politics.

George Throssell was born at Fermoy, County Cork, Ireland, on 23 May 1840.  The son of a Pensioner Guard, he came to Western Australia on board the Scindian in 1850 with his parents, and was educated at the Perth Public School.  He began his own business as a produce merchant, "Geo. Throssell & Co.", in the town of Northam in 1861 and served as the Northam postmaster from 1864 to 1874.  Throssell became owner of a flour mill, farms and a chain of shops; in 1885 his company became "Throssell & Son" with the admission of his son Lionel, and the following year with the addition of W. J. Stewart, "Throssell, Son & Stewart". George was active in the Northam community; he was first elected to the Northam Municipal Council in 1880, of which he was chairman until 1883 and again from 1885 to 1887.  He subsequently served as Mayor of Northam for broken periods until 1894.  Throssell was popularly known as "the lion of Northam", and was Northam's first citizen in 1890 when was elected unopposed to the Legislative Assembly seat of Northam.

In 1897 Throssell joined Sir John Forrest's government as Commissioner of Crown Lands, a key responsibility in a rapidly developing colony.  When Forrest resigned as premier to join the federal parliament, Throssell took over as premier and treasurer on 15 February 1901.  However, in the election of the following April, the "ministerialists" or former Forrest supporters failed to attain a majority of seats.  On 27 May Throssell resigned as premier and as the leader of his group, but continued as MLA for Northam.  He did not contest the 1904 election for health reasons, but returned to parliament in 1907 after winning a by-election for the Legislative Council's East Province, the electoral region that included Northam.  He served until his death on 30 August 1910.

George Throssell married Annie Morrell in 1861, and was the father of at least twelve children, one of whom was Captain Hugo Throssell VC.  George Throssell was created a CMG in 1901.

Sources

References

1840 births
1910 deaths
Mayors of places in Western Australia
Australian Companions of the Order of St Michael and St George
Members of the Western Australian Legislative Assembly
Members of the Western Australian Legislative Council
Politicians from County Cork
Premiers of Western Australia
Treasurers of Western Australia
Australian flour millers and merchants
Settlers of Western Australia
Irish emigrants to colonial Australia
People from Fermoy
19th-century Australian businesspeople
Western Australian local councillors